Bell Hotel or Hotel Bell or variations may refer to:

United Kingdom
The Olde Bell, Hurley, Berkshire
The Old Bell Hotel, Derby, Derbyshire
Bell Hotel, Thetford, Norfolk
The Old Bell, Malmesbury, Wiltshire

United States
Hotel Bell (Alva, Oklahoma), listed on the National Register of Historic Places (NRHP)
Bell Hotel (Ephrata, Washington), NRHP-listed in Grant County

China
Bell Tower Hotel, Xian

See also
Old Bell (disambiguation), name of many public houses, inns